The 1949–50 Allsvenskan was the 16th season of the top division of Swedish handball. 10 teams competed in the league. IFK Kristianstad won the league, but the title of Swedish Champions was awarded to the winner of Svenska mästerskapet. IFK Karlskrona and F 11 IF were relegated.

League table

Attendance

References 

Swedish handball competitions